Roger Gaudry,  (December 15, 1913 – October 7, 2001) was a Canadian chemist, businessman, corporate director, and rector of the Université de Montréal.

Early life and education

Born in Quebec City, Quebec, he received a Bachelor of Science (B.Sc.) in chemistry in 1937 and a Doctor of Science (D.Sc.) in chemistry in 1940 from Université Laval. A Rhodes scholar, he attended the University of Oxford from 1937 to 1939.

Career

From 1940 to 1945, he was assistant professor of chemistry in the Faculty of Medicine at Université Laval. He was appointed associate professor in 1945 and professor in 1950.

In 1954, he became assistant director of research at Ayerst, McKenna & Harrison Ltd. in Montréal  From 1957 to 1965, he was director and vice-president from 1963 to 1965. From 1965 to 1975, he served as the rector of the Université de Montréal.

He was a member of the board of directors of the following companies: Connaught Laboratories Ltd., CDC Life Sciences Inc., Bank of Montreal, Alcan, Hoechst Canada, S.K.W. Canada Ltd., Bio-Recherche Ltée, Corby Distilleries Ltd, and St. Lawrence Starch Co. Ltd.

From 1983 to 1995, he was president of the Fondation Jules et Paul-Emile Léger, a Canadian charity which supports groups that help restore human dignity to those who have been rejected by society.

After his death in 2001, he was entombed at the Notre Dame des Neiges Cemetery in Montreal.

Honours
 In 1954, he was made a Fellow of the Royal Society of Canada.
 In 1968, he was made a Companion of the Order of Canada.
 In 1980, he received an honorary doctorate from Concordia University.
 In 1992, he was made a Grand Officer of the National Order of Quebec.
 In 1996, he became the recipient of the José Vasconcelos World Award of Education
 In 2003, the main pavilion at Université de Montréal, Roger-Gaudry Building, was renamed in his honor.

References

 

1913 births
2001 deaths
Canadian chemists
Canadian Rhodes Scholars
Canadian university and college chief executives
Companions of the Order of Canada
Fellows of the Royal Society of Canada
French Quebecers
Grand Officers of the National Order of Quebec
People from Quebec City
Université Laval alumni
Burials at Notre Dame des Neiges Cemetery